Artie is an unincorporated community in Raleigh County, West Virginia, United States. Artie had a post office, which opened on October 5, 1903, and closed on February 1, 1997.

The main road through Artie is County Route 1, also known as Clear Fork Road. The Clear Fork describes the river in Artie, which is part of the headwaters of the Big Coal River. County Route 1 crosses the river twice in Artie via roadway bridges. Both bridges have been named for United States Armed Services members, US Army PFC Shelby Dean Stover, and USAF SMSgt Billie Edward Hodge.

In 2014, standout West Virginia sports player and coach, Tex Williams, opened a museum of sports artifacts inside the old Post Office building.

References

Unincorporated communities in Raleigh County, West Virginia
Unincorporated communities in West Virginia